New in Town is a 2009 American-Canadian romantic comedy drama film, directed by Jonas Elmer, starring Renée Zellweger, Harry Connick Jr., and Siobhan Fallon Hogan. It was filmed in Winnipeg and Selkirk, Manitoba, Canada, and in Los Angeles and South Beach, Miami, Florida. The film opened to negative reviews but was a financial success grossing $30 million against its $8 million budget.

Plot
High-powered consultant Lucy Hill, who loves her upscale Miami lifestyle, is sent to New Ulm, Minnesota, to oversee the restructuring of a food manufacturing plant. The factory is meant to add Japanese automation, and reduce staff by at least 50 percent.

After enduring a frosty reception from the locals, icy roads and freezing weather, Lucy warms up to the small town's charm, and eventually finds herself being accepted by the community. Specifically the head of the workers' union, Ted Mitchell and she gets off on the wrong foot. 

However, Ted rescuing Lucy from a snowbank and later her helping the widower's 13 year old daughter get ready for her first dance, causes them both to see the good in each other.

When Lucy is ordered to close down the plant and put the entire community out of work, she's forced to reconsider her goals and priorities, and find a way to save the town. After tasting her secretary's secret recipe of tapioca pudding, she decides to adapt their former yogurt production line to produce this special recipe of tapioca.

When the tapioca becomes extremely successful, Lucy's company is set to expand across the country, shutting down the small Minnesota plant. Before they can do so, she negotiates so that the employees become shareholders. She becomes the CEO, and Lucy and Ted seal the deal with a kiss on the plant floor.

Cast

 Renée Zellweger as Lucy Hill
 Harry Connick Jr. as Ted Mitchell
 J.K. Simmons as Stu Kopenhafer
 Siobhan Fallon Hogan as Blanche Gunderson
 Frances Conroy as Trudy Van Uuden

Release
The film was released at 1,941 theaters on January 30, 2009 and grossed in its opening day approx. $2.4 million to $2.5 million. By the end of the first 3-day weekend, it had grossed an estimated $6.75 million, placing it 8th for the weekend in gross box office ticket sales.

Box office
The film grossed $16,734,283 at the domestic box office, $12,276,534 at the foreign box office for a total gross of $30,010,817 worldwide.

Critical reception
New in Town received mostly negative reviews from critics. The film has a 27% approval rating on the review aggregator website Rotten Tomatoes, based on 171 reviews with an average rating of 4.2/10, with the consensus: "Clichéd and short on charm, New In Town is a pat genre exercise that fails to bring the necessary heat to its Minnesota setting." Allan Hunter of the Daily Express has said, "Predictable and uninspired, it is one more example of the dumb comedies that Hollywood is churning out at an alarming rate." Peter Bradshaw of The Guardian was also critical, stating "Renée Zellweger's rabbity, dimply pout – surely the strangest facial expression in Hollywood – simpers and twitches out of the screen in this moderate girly flick that adheres with almost religious fanaticism to the feelgood romcom handbook."

DVD
The "making of..." feature on the DVD documents that the cast and crew survived bitterly cold temperatures of below  in Manitoba, which sometimes resulted in malfunctions of cameras and other equipment.

Soundtrack
Songs featured in trailer/TV spots:
 Kelly Clarkson – "Breakaway"
 David Archuleta – "Crush"
 Ingrid Michaelson – "Be OK"
 The Kills – "Cheap and Chearful"
 Lenka – "The Show"

Songs featured in the film: 
 Perk Badger – "Do Your Stuff"
 Donavon Frankenreiter – "Move by Yourself"
 APM Music – "I'm Movin' Out"
 T-Rex – "20th Century Boy"
 Katrina and the Waves – "Walking on Sunshine"
 Renée Zellweger – "I Will Survive"
 Crit Harmon – "Boss Of Everything"
 Missy Higgins – "Steer"
 Elizabeth & The Catapult – "Race You"
 Brittini Black – "Life Is Good"
 Craig N. Cisco – "On The Other Side"
 Tift Merritt – "Another Country"
 Marty Jensen – "Just Because We're Over"
 Carrie Underwood – "That's Where It Is"
 Moot Davis – "In The Thick Of It"
 Natalia Safran – "Hey You" (featuring Mikolaj Jaroszyk)

References

External links
 
 
 
 
 

2009 films
2009 romantic comedy films
American romantic comedy films
Canadian romantic comedy films
English-language Canadian films
Films produced by Peter Safran
Films scored by John Swihart
Films set in Miami
Films set in Minnesota
Films shot in Los Angeles
Films shot in Miami
Films shot in Winnipeg
Gold Circle Films films
Lionsgate films
Selkirk, Manitoba
Films directed by Jonas Elmer (director)
2000s English-language films
2000s American films
2000s Canadian films